Grønligrotta (or Grønligrotten) is a karst cave in the municipality of Rana in Nordland, Norway. It is located in the valley of Røvassdalen, and was first explored in 1914. It is probably connected to the nearby Setergrotta. The cave is equipped with artificial lights and open for tourists.

References

Caves of Norway
Karst caves
Landforms of Nordland
Rana, Norway
Tourist attractions in Nordland